Espen Heggli Christensen (born 17 June 1985) is a Norwegian handball player for IFK Kristianstad and formerly the Norwegian national team.

He competed at the 2016 European Men's Handball Championship.

References

External links

1985 births
Living people
Norwegian male handball players
Sportspeople from Stavanger
Norwegian expatriate sportspeople in Denmark
Norwegian expatriate sportspeople in Germany
Norwegian expatriate sportspeople in Sweden
Expatriate handball players
Handball-Bundesliga players
Lugi HF players
IFK Kristianstad players